Azygophleps aburae is a moth in the family Cossidae. It is found in Zimbabwe, Kenya, Ghana, Cameroon and Sudan.

References

Moths described in 1880
Azygophleps